Hanover Island (Spanish: Isla Hanover) is an island in the Magallanes Region. It is separated from the Chatham Island by the Esteban Channel, Guías Narrows and Inocentes Channel.

Literature
In popular fiction, a fictionalized version of the island is featured in Jules Verne's book 'Two Years' Vacation'. The book tells the story of 15 boys (aged between 8 and 14) from Auckland, New Zealand, who spent 2 years on this remote island as a result of a storm, which cast their schooner upon the island's shore. There it is called "Chairman Island" after the name of the boys' boarding school.

The Torres del Paine National Park is located on the continental side.

See also
 List of islands of Chile

External links
 Islands of Chile @ United Nations Environment Programme
 World island information @ WorldIslandInfo.com
 South America Island High Points above 1000 meters
 United States Hydrographic Office, South America Pilot 1916)

Islands of Magallanes Region